Irena Kuznetsov (born 24 April 2002) is an Israeli professional footballer who plays as defender for German club 1. FFC Turbine Potsdam and the Israel women's national team.

She also holds a Russian passport.

Early life
Kuznetsov was born and raised in Hadera, Israel, to parents who immigrated from Russia to Israel.

Club career 
After having played in the boys' sections of the professional men's Israeli Premier League club of Ironi Sport Hadera, Kuznetsov was scouted in 2012 by the professional women's club of the Israeli Ligat Nashim's club, Maccabi Kishronot Hadera.

In 2012, she began her junior career in a club in the Israeli women's Premier League, where she played until 2016.

In 2016, she signed with the Ligat Nashim club of the Israeli National Women's Football Academy, and made her professional debut at the age of 14.

In 2019, she signed for the season and joined the Israeli club Maccabi Bnot Emek Hefer.

During the summer of 2020, at 18 years of age, she joined the Cypriot first division club AEL Limassol.

In November 2020, following poor working conditions, she terminated her contract to engage with Israeli club Maccabi Kishronot Hadera.

In January 2022, Kuznetsov joined German Bundesliga Turbine Potsdam, signing a 3.5 year contract. In May 2022, she played in the 2021–22 DFB-Pokal Final, which they lost 4–0 to VfL Wolfsburg.

Honors 
 Best revelation of the Israeli Women's Premier League 2016–2017
 Best defender of Israeli Women's Premier League 2017–2018
 Best defender of September/October Cyprus's Women's Premier League 2020-2011

See also
List of Israelis
Sports in Israel
Noa Selimhodzic

References

External links

2002 births
Living people
Footballers from Hadera
Israeli women's footballers
Women's association football defenders
Maccabi Kishronot Hadera F.C. players
AEL Limassol players
F.C. Ramat HaSharon players
1. FFC Turbine Potsdam players
Ligat Nashim players
Frauen-Bundesliga players
Israel women's international footballers
Israeli expatriate women's footballers
Israeli expatriate sportspeople in Cyprus
Expatriate women's footballers in Cyprus
Israeli expatriate sportspeople in Germany
Expatriate women's footballers in Germany
Israeli people of Russian descent
Israeli people of Soviet descent
Russian people of Israeli descent